Blackville is a community, formerly an incorporated village, in Northumberland County, New Brunswick, Canada.

History

The first post office opened in the area in 1842, under the community name "Decantillon's"; the area known as The Forks was also serviced by this post office. In 1847, these areas collectively became known as Blackville, as the area was the largest population centre in the Parish of Blackville. The parish, created in 1830 when it was partitioned from the Parish of Ludlow, had been named in honour of William Black, the acting governor of the colony of New Brunswick from 1829 to 1831.

Blackville was first incorporated as a village in 1967, annexing the neighbouring communities of Underhill and Breadalbane later that year.

On 1 January 2023, Blackville amalgamated with all or part of eight local service districts to form the new incorporated rural community of Miramichi River Valley. Blackville remains in official use.

Demographics 

Government
Blackville residents are able to cast votes in the Miramichi River Valley Rural Community's elections for mayor, three at-large councillors, and the Ward 3 councillor. The community is within the federal electoral district of Miramichi-Grand Lake, and within the provincial electoral district of Southwest Miramichi-Bay du Vin.

The mayors of Blackville during its time as an incorporated village from 1967 to 2022 included:
 Lawrence Stephens (1967-1969)
 Harold Connors (1969-1971)
 Roland Walls (1971-1992)
 Glen Hollowood (1992-1998)
 Roland Walls (1998-2001)
 Omer MacKenzie (2001-2004)
 Glen Hollowood (2004-2012)
 Harold Muck (2012-2013)
 Matthew Sturgeon (2013)
 Andrew Hawkes (2013-2016)
 Christopher Hennessy (2016-2021)
 Ian Fortune (2021-2022)

Economy
Blackville's economy was once tied to the forest industry.  A large sawmill that employed 200 workers had been operated in the village by industrial conglomerate UPM Kymmene, but it closed in 2007 as a result of economic pressures.

According to the 2016 Census, Blackville citizens had a median income of $30,816 for individuals, and $62,976 for households in 2015. Blackville's unemployment rate was 21.9%.

Blackville is home to a single financial institution, Blackville Credit Union. It is the oldest of its kind in New Brunswick.

Education
Blackville School, grades K - 12, is a public school in the community. This is the only grade school in Blackville, with students occasionally transporting to other Miramichi schools instead (Such as Miramichi Valley High School).

Notable people

Herb Curtis
J. F. A. McManus
Kathy McCormack
Marion Leane Smith (Lived her final years and died in Blackville.)

See also
List of communities in New Brunswick

References

External links

Village of Blackville

Communities in Northumberland County, New Brunswick
Former villages in New Brunswick